Guyonne de Laval née Renée de Rieux (1524–1567) was a French suo jure countess of Laval 1547–1567.  She, along with Louis, Prince of Condé (1530–1569), Gaspard II de Coligny and François de Coligny d'Andelot are pointed out as one of the instigators of the famous Surprise of Meaux of 1567.

Life

Early life
She was born to Claude I de Rieux (1497–1532), Sire de Rieux et de Rochefort, Comte d’Harcourt et d’Aumale, and Catherine de Laval (1504–1526).
She served as lady-in-waiting to the queen of France, Eleanor of Austria, in 1533–1547. In 1540 she married Louis de Sainte-Maure.

Countess of Laval
In 1547, she inherited the title Count of Laval from her maternal grandfather Guy XVI de Laval. Because of her sex, she was forced to share the title and domain with her husband Louis de Sainte-Maure (jure uxoris). Because all the counts of Laval were named Guy, she and her spouse changed their names to Guyonne and Guy.

Divorce and the Huguenot Wars
She lived in an unhappy marriage. When her husband has her imprisoned, she escaped in 1557. Her husband was given a parliamentary decision that she should return to marriage. When she refused, her husband convinced the Pope to excommunicate her. As a response, Guyonne de Laval converted to Calvinism and became one a prominent Huguenot supporter during the French wars of religion.

References 

1524 births
1567 deaths
French people of the French Wars of Religion
French ladies-in-waiting
People excommunicated by the Catholic Church
Court of Francis I of France